Nigel Charles Hallett (born 6 February 1953) is an Australian politician. He was a member of the Western Australian Legislative Council representing the South West Region from 2005 to 2017. Elected to Parliament in the 2005 state election he was a member of the Liberal Party until 16 June 2016, when he announced he was resigning from the Liberal Party and joining the Shooters, Fishers and Farmers Party, which he represented at the 2017 election. He was not re-elected.

Hallett completed his early education in Bridgetown but completed high school education at Hampton Senior High School in Perth.

He is married to Susan Hallett and they have two sons; Ian and Michael.

In 2020 the Western Australian Corruption and Crime Commission found that Hallett improperly employed his girlfriend in his office, despite her not doing any meaningful work. He was also found to have engaged in serious misconduct in using his electorate allowance to fund personal lifestyle expenses, including expensive dinners and visits to strip clubs.

References

1953 births
Living people
Members of the Western Australian Legislative Council
Liberal Party of Australia members of the Parliament of Western Australia
Shooters, Fishers and Farmers Party politicians
People from Bridgetown, Western Australia
21st-century Australian politicians